Jim Zulevic (February 20, 1965 – January 7, 2006) was an American actor, improvisational comedian, television writer, and radio host. He died suddenly, most likely due to a heart attack, at age 40.

Early life 
Zulevic, of Scottish and Croatian extraction, grew up in Chicago, where he graduated from St. Thomas More Grammar School, Brother Rice High School and Columbia College Chicago.
 
He went on to work a number of jobs, from underaged bouncer at Chicago's famed Exit club to a runner at the Board of Trade to support his acting habit. All the while he studied at The Second City, where he was taken under the wing of mentor Sheldon Patinkin. Before joining the Second City, he performed for a short time at Chicago's Improv Institute.

Second City
Zulevic joined The Second City comedy troupe in 1992.  He starred in nine stage revues, including "Paradigm Lost" in 1997 with Tina Fey, Scott Adsit and Rachel Dratch. Zulevic created his most famous character of "Billy" at this time.

Television 
Zulevic wrote for the Jamie Kennedy Experiment.
He appeared on Curb Your Enthusiasm, The Drew Carey Show, Early Edition, Prison Break, Real Time with Bill Maher, The Shield, and the final episode of the long-running series, Seinfeld.

He also created commercials for the Fox Broadcasting Company in Chicago, where he was known for his quirky comments on reruns of The Simpsons.

Movies 
Zulevic appeared in The Bogus Witch Project, 50 Ways to Leave Your Lover, Let's Go to Prison, Matchstick Men, The Specials, and Talent.  He also directed a comedy short, Baby Time Share, in 2005.

Other activities 
Zulevic hosted the weekly radio show "Second City Radio" on WCKG-FM, and taught improv classes at Columbia College Chicago and The Second City.
Jim was working with Bob Odenkirk on a project based on the July 1979 Disco Demolition Night at Comiskey Park at the time of his death.

Filmography

References

External links

Variety writeup
Interview at Zulkey.com

1965 births
2006 deaths
American male comedians
American male film actors
American male television actors
American television writers
American male television writers
Male actors from Chicago
American people of Croatian descent
American people of Scottish descent
Comedians from Illinois
Screenwriters from Illinois
20th-century American comedians
21st-century American comedians
20th-century American male actors
20th-century American screenwriters
20th-century American male writers